Susan Weinert (24 June 1965 – 2 March 2020) was a German guitarist and songwriter.

Career
Weinert was born in Neunkirchen. Called one of the masters of jazz fusion, she played over 3,000 performances.

On her first album in 1992, WDR radio chose Mysterious Stories as jazz production of the year. In 2004, Weinert with her husband Martin Weinert on bass, singer Francesco Cottone, and Hardy Fischötter on drums recorded Running Out of Time.

Weinert died from cancer at the age 54 on 2 March 2020.

Discography 
 Mysterious Stories (veraBra, 1992)
 Crunch Time (veraBra, 1994)
 The Bottom Line (veraBra, 1996)
 Point of View (Intuition, 1999)
 Triple Talk Live (Skip, 2002)
 Synergy with Martin Weinert (Skip, 2002)
 Running Out of Time (Tough Tone, 2004)
 Dancing On the Water (Tough Tone, 2006)
 Tomorrow's Dream (Tough Tone, 2007)
 Thoughts & Memories (Tough Tone, 2010)
 Fjord with Martin Weinert (Tough Tone, 2015)
 Beyond the Rainbow (Tough Tone, 2018)

References

External links 
 Official site
 Discography for Susan Weinert
 Discography for Susan Weinert Band

1965 births
2020 deaths
German guitarists
German songwriters
People from Neunkirchen, Saarland
Deaths from cancer in Germany